Alan Myerson (born July 1, 1940) is an American film and television director.

Career
Myerson began working in theatre in New York City, then directing The Second City in Chicago. He founded the improvisational comedy troupe The Committee in San Francisco in 1963. He directed films in the 1970s and 1980s, and has directed over 200 television episodes for shows such as Ally McBeal, Boston Public, Friends, Boy Meets World, The Larry Sanders Show, Picket Fences, Miami Vice, Laverne & Shirley, Rhoda, The Bob Newhart Show, and Busting Loose. He has taught acting at UC Berkeley, SF State, and directing at Maine Media Workshops. He is an adjunct professor at the University of Southern California, and has received nominations for Emmy, DGA, and CableACE awards. His son, Lincoln Myerson, is an improvisational performer.

Filmography

as director
Steelyard Blues (1973)
Private Lessons (1981)
Bayou Romance (1982)
Police Academy 5 (1988)

as actor
Funnyman (1967) - Seymour, Electronics Man
Billy Jack (1971) - O.K. Corrales
Police Academy 5 (1988) - Cigar Smoker

Selected television credits
The TVTV Show (1976)
Michael Nesmith in Television Parts (1985)
Hi Honey – I'm Dead (1991)
Bad Attitudes (1991)
Boy Meets World (1993–2000)
The Larry Sanders Show (1994-1998)
Ned & Stacey (1995)
Friends (1996)
Holiday Affair (1996)

References

External links

 

American television directors
American film directors
Comedy film directors
1940 births
Living people
University of Southern California faculty
American male stage actors